Denis-Perron dam is a rockfill embankment dam spanning the Sainte-Marguerite River, a tributary of the lower Saint Lawrence River, in eastern Quebec, Canada. The dam is the second highest in Quebec and the hydraulic head afforded to its power plant is also the largest in the province.

Construction on the dam began in 1994 after seven years of studies and planning. An average of 500 workers and a maximum of 1,200, most of whom lived in a construction camp that opened in January 1995, were employed at the dam site during construction. After the cutting of some 233 million board feet of lumber from the future reservoir site, the dam began to impound water in 1998 and finally reached capacity in 2001. No area residents were displaced as a result of the remote location, but a large portion of the territory of the indigenous Innu people was flooded. In 1994, Hydro-Québec paid the local Innu CA$20.9 million as compensation.

Full project completion was reached in 2002 at a cost of CA$2.4 billion, making it one of the most significant 21st century hydroelectric developments in North America. After the dam was finished, temporary facilities used during construction were dismantled to ease impact on the local environment. The main workers' camp was actually demolished in 2001, a year before the project's final completion. These areas were replanted with some six hundred thousand trees. Hydroelectricity generation began in 2003. As of 2003, the dam was projected to generate about 2.73 TWh of electricity per year, or an average output of just over 310 megawatts (MW).

Hydro-Québec is in the process of adding a third unit, bringing the total generating capacity to 1,322 MW, scheduled for completion in 2014.

See also
 List of largest power stations in Canada
 List of tallest dams in the world

References

Dams in Quebec
Dams completed in 2002
2003 establishments in Quebec
Underground power stations
Rock-filled dams
Energy infrastructure completed in 2003